HMS LST-364 was a  in the Royal Navy during World War II.

Construction and career 
LST-364 was laid down on 3 September 1942 by Bethlehem Steel Company, Quincy, Massachusetts. Launched on 26 October 1942 and commissioned into the Royal Navy on 7 December 1942.

During World War II, LST-364 was assigned to the Europe-Africa-Middle theater. She took part in the Sicilian occupation in Italy from 9 to 15 July 1943 and 28 July to 17 August 1943. Then the Salerno landings from 9 to 21 September of the same year. 

On 22 January 1944, she took part in the Anzio invasion and later the Invasion of Normandy in June 1944. 

She was struck from the Navy Register on 11 July 1945.

Citations

Sources 
 
 
 
 

 

World War II amphibious warfare vessels of the United Kingdom
Ships built in Quincy, Massachusetts
1942 ships
LST-1-class tank landing ships of the Royal Navy
Ships sunk by German submarines in World War II